Abdelwahab Doukkali (born 2 January 1941) is a Moroccan composer and performer. He was born in Fes, one of the 13 children of a conservative family. At the age of 18, in 1959, he went to Rabat, where he worked briefly at RTM (Radio Television Maroc), but upon seeing his boredom, colleagues encouraged him to move to Casablanca where he first entered the music culture. From 1959 to 1962 he pursued careers in both theatre and radio. He toured Algeria in 1962, then left Morocco and settled in Cairo. During his three years in Egypt, he gained popularity outside North Africa, then returned to Morocco in 1965. Doukkali continued to write and perform music through the 1990s, including popularly acclaimed songs such as Kān yā mākān and Montparnasse. His works include songs in both Moroccan dialect as well as literary Arabic. He is the recipient of numerous awards and honors, including the Mérite et Dévouement français in 2004, the Grand Prix Humanitaire de France in 2006, and medals from both Pope John Paul II and Pope Benedict XVI. His music has been featured in several films from Morocco.

Filmography 
 Vaincre pour Vivre (Life is a Struggle), 1968, 105 min, B&W, 35mm

References

See also 
Abdelhadi Belkhayat

1941 births
Living people
Moroccan composers
People from Fez, Morocco
20th-century Moroccan male singers